Fritillaria pudica, the yellow fritillary, is a small perennial plant found in the sagebrush country in the western United States (Idaho, Montana, Oregon, Washington, Wyoming, very northern California, Nevada, northwestern Colorado, North Dakota and Utah) and Canada (Alberta and British Columbia). It is a member of the lily family Liliaceae. Another common (but somewhat ambiguous) name is "yellow bells", since it has a bell-shaped yellow flower. It may be found in dryish, loose soil; it is amongst the first plants to flower after the snow melts, but the flower does not last very long; as the petals age, they turn a brick-red colour and begin to curl outward. The flowers grow singly or in pairs on the stems, and the floral parts grow in multiples of threes. The species produces a small corm, which forms corms earning the genus the nickname 'riceroot'. During his historic journey, Meriwether Lewis collected a specimen while passing through Idaho in 1806.

The corm can be dug up and eaten fresh or cooked; it served Native Americans as a good source of food in times past, and is still eaten occasionally. Today these plants are not common, so digging and eating the corms is not encouraged. The plant is called  in Sahaptin.

References

External links

USDA Plants Profile
Photo gallery

pudica
Flora of North America
Garden plants
Edible plants
Plants described in 1814
Plants used in Native American cuisine